The following is a list of Nippon Professional Baseball players with the last name starting with N, retired or active.

N
Hiroshi Nagadomi
Satoshi Nagai
Tomohiro Nagai
Yasuo Nagaike
Katsuhiro Nagakawa
Kenji Nagami
Shoji Nagamine
Yoshinari Nagano
Kenji Nagasaka
Hajime Nagasaki
Shinichi Nagasaki
Takeo Nagasawa
Kazushige Nagashima
Kiyoyuki Nagashima
Shigeo Nagashima
Masahiro Nagata
Masaru Nagata
Yoshitaka Nagata
Naoyuki Naitoh
Yuta Naitoh
Toshio Naka
Yusuke Nakabayashi
Koji Nakada
Hiroki Nakagawa
Takaharu Nakagawa
Taiki Nakagoh
Shin Nakagomi
Hiroyuki Nakahama
Naoki Nakahigashi
Daisuke Nakai
Haruyasu Nakajima
Hiroyuki Nakajima
Satoshi Nakajima
Terushi Nakajima
Kazuki Nakamoto
Akira Nakamura
Hayato Nakamura
Issei Nakamura
Katsuhiro Nakamura
Ken Nakamura
Koichi Nakamura
Koji Nakamura
Masato Nakamura
Micheal Nakamura
Norihiro Nakamura
Ryoji Nakamura
Takeshi Nakamura
Takeya Nakamura
Wataru Nakamura
Yasuhiro Nakamura
Yoshiyuki Nakamura
Yutaka Nakamura
Hitoshi Nakane
Chikashi Nakanishi
Futoshi Nakanishi
Kenta Nakanishi
Kiyooki Nakanishi
Yukihito Nakanishi
Eiichi Nakano
Yukiyasu Nakanose
Susumu Nakanowatari
Toshihiro Nakao
Toshiya Nakashima
Kenichi Nakata
Sho Nakata
Shota Nakata
Jin Nakatani
Tsubasa Nakatani
Hiroaki Nakayama
Masayuki Nakayama
Mitsuhisa Nakayama
Shinya Nakayama
Atsushi Nakazato
Tetsuya Nakazato
Tadaatsu Nakazawa
Masashi Nara
Hiroshi Narahara
Toshihide Narimoto
Yoshihisa Naruse
Masataka Nashida
Takumi Nasuno
Troy Neel
Hirotaka Neichi
Bryant Nelson
Maximo Nelson
Rikuo Nemoto
Ryuki Nemoto
Shunichi Nemoto
Tomohisa Nemoto
Alan Newman
Satoshi Nibe
Rod Nichols
Melvin Nieves
Kaoru Nihei
Shinji Niinuma
Dave Nilsson
Toru Nimura
Masami Ninomiya
Tomohiro Nioka
Kiyotaka Nishi
Shunji Nishi
Toshihisa Nishi
Yoshihiro Nishi
Shinji Nishida
Tokuo Nishigaki
Fumiya Nishiguchi
Takayuki Nishijima
Akira Nishikawa
Junji Nishikawa
Shinichi Nishikawa
Takashi Nishimoto
Yukio Nishimoto
Kentaro Nishimura
Masao Nishimura
Motofumi Nishimura
Norifumi Nishimura
Tatsuji Nishimura
Wataru Nishimura
Yuki Nishimura
Hiroshi Nishioka
Tsuyoshi Nishioka
Yoshihiro Nishioka
Hisanori Nishitani
Katsuhiro Nishiura
Kazutaka Nishiyama
Michitaka Nishiyama
Shūji Nishiyama
Nobuhiro Nishizaki
Satoshi Nishizaki
Yukihiro Nishizaki
Michio Nishizawa
Yōsuke Nishizawa
C. J. Nitkowski
Takuma Nitoh
Hisao Niura
Masaya Niwa
Hiroki Nobayashi
Daisuke Nobue
Takuto Nobuhara
Koji Noda
Kosuke Noda
Akira Noguchi
Jiro Noguchi
Shigeki Noguchi
Toshihiro Noguchi
Yoshiyuki Noguchi
Masashi Nohara
Atsushi Nohmi
Wataru Nohnin
Takahiko Nomaguchi
Hideo Nomo
Hiroki Nomura
Hiroyuki Nomura
Katsunori Nomura
Katsuya Nomura
Kenjiro Nomura
Takahito Nomura
Shingo Nonaka
Tetsuhiro Nonaka
Takeshi Nonogaki
Hiroshi Numata
Jose Nunez

References

External links
Japanese Baseball

 N